Sayyad in Iran may refer to:
 Sayyad, Bushehr
 Sayyad, Kurdistan